Ijewuru is a Nigerian comedy film about food competitions. It features the actors Baba Tee and Eniola Badmus. It was produced by Babatunde Bernard Tayo.

Awards and nominations 
At the 2012 Best of Nollywood Awards (BON), the film was nominated for the Comedy Movie of the Year. Additionally, Badmus was nominated for Best Yoruba Actress. The film was also nominated for Best Comedy Film at the Annual Yoruba Movies Academy Awards (YMAA) in 2014.

References 

2011 films
Nigerian comedy-drama films